Arjen van der Kieft (born 17 May 1985) is a Dutch long-distance speed skater. He competed for the Netherlands at the 2010 Winter Olympics in the men's 10000 metres, where he finished 9th.

Career highlights

National Championships
2010 - Heerenveen, 10th allround

References 

1985 births
Dutch male speed skaters
Speed skaters at the 2010 Winter Olympics
Olympic speed skaters of the Netherlands
Universiade medalists in speed skating
People from Haarlemmermeer
Living people
Universiade gold medalists for the Netherlands
Universiade bronze medalists for the Netherlands
Competitors at the 2005 Winter Universiade
Competitors at the 2009 Winter Universiade
Sportspeople from North Holland
21st-century Dutch people